Hydra Entertainment is a hip hop record label specializing in Instrumental hip hop.  They are most notable for their Hydra Beats series of instrumental albums by prominent hip hop producers.  All of its releases are out of print.

Hip hop group Screwball also released several records on Hydra.

Discography
Hydra Beats Volume 1 The Unsociables
Hydra Beats Volume 2 E-Boogie
Hydra Beats Volume 3 Godfather Don
Hydra Beats Volume 4 A Kid Called Roots
Hydra Beats Volume 5 The Beatnuts, 1997
Hydra Beats Volume 6 Ghetto Pros
Hydra Beats Volume 7 Godfather Don
Hydra Beats Volume 8 Anniversary Compilation
Hydra Beats Volume 9 A Kid Called Roots
Hydra Beats Volume 10 Ghetto Pros, 1997
Hydra Beats Volume 11 Godfather Don
Hydra Beats Volume 12 Nick Wiz
Hydra Beats Volume 13 A Kid Called Roots
Hydra Beats Volume 14 Godfather Don

External links
Interview with label founder Jerry Famolari
Interview with label co-founder Mike Heron
Discogs entry

Hip hop record labels
American record labels